Guadeloupe elects a legislature on the regional and departmental level. The legislature consists of two councils with diverging powers. The Regional Council of Guadeloupe (Conseil régional) has 41 members, elected for a four-year term by proportional representation. The Departmental Council of Guadeloupe (Conseil général), known as the General Council until 2015, has members elected for a six-year term in single-seat constituencies. 
Guadeloupe has a multi-party system, with numerous parties in which no one party often has a chance of gaining power alone, and parties must work with each other to form coalition governments.

Last elections

2004 Regional Elections

Seats

Past elections

1998 Regional Elections

1992 Regional Elections

1986 Regional Elections

See also
Electoral calendar
Electoral system